The Piano Concerto in C major, Op. 39  by Ferruccio Busoni, is one of the largest works ever written in this genre. The concerto lasts around 70 minutes and is in five movements; in the final movement a men's chorus sings words from the final scene of the verse drama Aladdin by Adam Oehlenschläger, who also wrote the words of one of the Danish national anthems.

The first performance of the concerto took place in the Beethoven-Saal, Berlin, Germany, on November 10, 1904, at one of Busoni's own concerts of modern music. Busoni was the soloist, with Karl Muck conducting the Berlin Philharmonic Orchestra and the choir of the Kaiser Wilhelm Memorial Church (Kaiser-Wilhelm-Gedächtniskirche). The reviews were decidedly mixed, some being filled with outright hostility or derision. A year later, the work was performed in Amsterdam, with the Concertgebouw Orchestra conducted by Busoni himself and Egon Petri as soloist. The century following its premiere has seen relatively few performances, owing to the large orchestration, complex musical texture, the use of a male chorus, and the staggering demands put on the soloist.

It seems to have been Beethoven who first included a chorus in a concerted work with piano and orchestra, in his Choral Fantasy, Op. 80, of 1808; since then only a handful of works have been scored for similar forces, including Daniel Steibelt's Piano Concerto No. 8 (first performed March 16, 1820, in Saint Petersburg) and the Piano Concerto No. 6, Op. 192 (1858) by Henri Herz which also have a choral finale.

Busoni intended to dedicate the concerto to his friend William Dayas, but he died in 1903. His daughter Karin Dayas gave the first American performance of the concerto in 1932.

Movements
Although the five movements are laid out separately in the score, Busoni stated that the concerto should be played as a continuous whole, without breaks.

Introductio: Andante sostenuto
Prima pars: Andante, quasi adagio
Altera pars: Sommessamente
Ultima pars: a tempo

The first movement, marked "Prologo e introito" is a little over fifteen minutes long on average, and is a broad Allegro movement which features a clangorous piano part.

The second movement, a kind of Scherzo, is mostly a light-fingered affair for the piano that makes use of "Italianate" rhythms and melodic material, even if the melodies are more evocative of Italian popular music than actual quotations from indigenous Italian folk music.

The third and longest movement is the "Pezzo serioso", a massive meditation and exploration in four parts in the key of D flat major which has a central climax that is once again pianistically challenging and brilliantly scored for both the piano and the orchestra.

The fourth movement "All' Italiana", is perhaps the most variegated in its use of the orchestra, with a terrifically virtuosic piano part, arguably more difficult than anything that has come before it in the work. There are also two cadenzas to this movement – one, included in the printed score; the other, an insert in the two-piano score that is an amplification of the one printed in the two-piano edition.

The final movement, "Cantico" with male chorus, brings full circle many themes that have been heard earlier in the work. The words sung by the chorus are from the final scene of Oehlenschläger's verse drama Aladdin.

Instrumentation
The concerto is scored for a large orchestra. (For the instrumentation in Italian see below.)

Piano solo
Woodwind
1 piccolo I (2nd and 4th movements)
3 flutes (III doubling piccolo II in 4th movement)
3 oboes (III doubling cor anglais in 2nd, 3rd and 5th movements)
3 clarinets (III doubling bass clarinet in 2nd and 3rd movements)
3 bassoons
Brass
4 horns; 3 trumpets; 3 trombones; 1 tuba
Strings
12 violins I; 10 violins II; 8 violas; 8 violoncellos;8 double basses (2 with five strings)

Percussion
3 timpani
3 additional percussion players:
bass drum (2nd, 3rd, 4th and 5th movements)
cymbals (2nd, 4th and 5th movements)
triangle (2nd, 4th and 5th movemens)
tambourine (2nd and 4th movements)
tam-tam (3rd movement only)
snare drum (4th movement only)
glockenspiel (4th and 5th movements)
Male chorus 
48 (8 each) tenors I & II, baritones I & II, and basses I & II

Problems of performance

Apart from the immense demands required of the soloist and the large forces needed, there is a further difficulty that can affect performances of this work: the role of the soloist.

As Busoni himself wrote, piano concertos tended to be modelled after either Mozart or Beethoven. In Mozart's case, the concerto centres around the spotlit virtuoso composer-performer, who appears to spontaneously create the work before us, on-stage. The orchestra mostly provides a background accompaniment. But with Beethoven, the work is often conceived in symphonic terms; the piano takes the secondary role, reflecting on or responding to ideas that have already been introduced by the orchestra (excepting the fourth piano concerto).

Busoni combined both these precedents in the Piano Concerto, Op. 39, creating a huge work of symphonic proportions which was originally accused of having only a piano obbligato. The work presents exceptional challenges for the soloist, who is often nevertheless required to incorporate a glittering cascade of notes into the overall orchestral sound. This self-abasement of the familiar 19th-century heroic soloist's role thus requires careful consideration of balance in performance. But as Edward Dent comments:

 Despite the incredible difficulty of the solo part, Busoni's concerto at no point offers a display of virtuosity. Even its cadenzas are subsidiary episodes. At the same time the pianoforte hardly ever presents a single theme in its most immediate and commanding shape. It is nearly always the orchestra which seems to be possessed of the composer's most prophetic inspiration. Busoni sits at the pianoforte, listens, comments, decorates, and dreams.

Busoni and Aladdin

Adam Oehlenschläger's verse drama Aladdin, or the Magic Lamp was first published in Danish in 1805.
The play has a number of parallels with the works and ideas of Goethe, such as the Faust-figure of the wicked magician Noureddin who takes advantage of Aladdin's youth and inexperience to get hold of the wonderful lamp; Goethe was also much preoccupied with Plato's philosophy, including his theory of Forms and the allegory of the Cave.

During his travels in Germany in 1805–6, Oehlenschläger spent several months in Weimar in the company of Goethe and his closest circle of friends. He used the opportunity of his daily visits to read out Aladdin to Goethe, freely translating from the Danish. At the time, Goethe was in the process of completing the final version of Faust, Part 1.

Subsequently, Oehlenschläger prepared a German edition of Aladdin, translating and revising the work himself and adding an explanatory introduction for his intended German readers. This edition was published in 1808 in Amsterdam. The new version included a special dedicatory poem To Goethe and was split into two parts, intended to be given on two successive evenings. More especially, this version had a new finale differing considerably from the original Danish edition by having various magical scenic transformations.

As Oehlenschläger stated in his introduction to the 1808 version of Aladdin, he was not a native speaker of German; he admitted to incorporating various Danish modes of expression (Danismen) into his translation. His "unidiomatic and erroneous" use of German had hindered the play's success. In preparing a later German edition (1820 at the latest), he made a large number of changes and minor improvements, also correcting his imperfect German: but he dropped the magical 1808 ending, reverting to the original Danish 1805 finale. The first complete English translation, by Theodore Martin, published in 1863, is also based on a later edition, thus the first editions in German are the only ones to incorporate the words which Busoni uses.

Busoni was quite taken with this early German version of Aladdin and planned to adapt it as a one-evening work. In a letter to his wife, dated London, February 10, 1902, Busoni wrote:
I have thought it out and decided not to use Oehlenschläger's Aladdin for an opera, but to write a composition in which drama music, dancing and magic are combined – cut down for one evening's performance if possible. It is my old idea of a play with music where it is necessary, without hampering the dialogue. As a spectacle and as a deep symbolic work it might be something similar to the Magic Flute; at the same time it would have a better meaning and an indestructible subject [mit besserem Sinn und einem nicht tot zu machenden Sujet]. Besides this, I have planned 6 works for the summer, the principal one being the pianoforte Concerto. How beautiful!

However, Busoni never completed his adaptation of Aladdin, although he did compose music for the final chorus in the magic cave; this soon made its way into the Piano Concerto. As Busoni's biographer Edward J. Dent remarks:
One may indeed wonder why an essentially Italian work should end with verses in praise of Allah. The plain fact was that Busoni at the moment happened to be interested in Aladdin and had set the final chorus to music. When he planned the Concerto he saw that this chorus, which has something of the mystical character of the concluding stanzas of Goethe's Faust, was exactly the music to give the general sense of serenity that he required for his own finale. It was from the original Aladdin chorus that he took the theme which occurs in the first movement; when he came to write out the last movement he felt that he missed the words, and therefore directed that a chorus of men's voices should sing them.

In the finale of the play, the grown-up Aladdin replaces the lamp with its genie (or spirit) back in the magic cave where he first found it. The somewhat obscure (if exalted) words that Busoni sets are voiced by the rock pillars themselves: Oehlenschläger's stage direction "Deep and quiet, the pillars of rock begin to sound:" is printed above the score where the chorus enters. Busoni follows the text exactly, only omitting a few verses which were not appropriate. According to Dent:  "The actual meaning of the words hardly matters. The chorus is directed to be invisible; it sings in plain chords, like a body of soft trombones added to the orchestra. The effect which Busoni desired was stated by him once in a letter to a friend who had mistakenly suggested to him that it might be better to re-write the chorus for mixed voices; he replied that he had no desire to convert his Concerto into an oratorio; he insisted that the chorus should be invisible, and said that its function was 'to add a new register to the sonorities which precede it'."

Goethe's Urphänomen
Nevertheless, in these mysterious lines added for the 1808 German edition of Aladdin after several months of daily contact with Goethe, Oehlenschläger seems to be drawing on Goethe's holistic, non-Newtonian concept of the Urphänomen (German: primordial phenomenon) which Goethe used in his scientific works, especially the Theory of Colours; at the same time, Hegel was also developing this idea in his own philosophy, involving the concept of the Gestalt (Ger: Form), sometimes translated as "formation" or "configuration of consciousness".

In his study of Danish poets and their encounters with German artistic movements, Viktor Schmitz  considers the Urphänomen – or genesis of the creative mindset – as expressed by Goethe, Oehlenschläger and Schiller, who had been close friends with Goethe for many years and died in May 1805. In a poem in which he pays homage to Goethe, Schiller praised happiness or luck (Glück) as a gift of the gods, a present without merit or benefit. This praise applied to what Schiller admired in Goethe, but did not possess himself. But for Oehlenschläger – since Aladdin – happiness remained a sign of election (ein Zeichen der Erwählung) and of itself, of 'having been chosen'; almost a primordial phenomenon (Urphänomen) of poetry, as the struggle (or war) was for Schiller, or the demonic for Goethe.

One alternative to this holistic approach was the dualism espoused by another Danish poet Jens Baggesen (a slightly older and overshadowed contemporary of Oehlenschläger), whose works were based on a consistently maintained pantheistic outlook, resulting in a strongly emphasized antithesis between the earthly and the heavenly. Baggesen, who wrote in accordance with a strictly defined poetics, deeply desired to overcome this tension; but since he realized that his own dualist climb toward lofty heights (a recurring motif) would scarcely be successful, he praised Oehlenschlager and Goethe, whose poetry seemed to promise a synthesis, a new world void of such restriction.

Hegel expressed the idea of the Urphänomen in a letter to Goethe in February 1821 as the concept of "a spiritual breath: ... To ferret out the Urphänomen, to free it from those further environs which are accidental to it, to apprehend as we say abstractly – I take this to be a matter of spiritual intelligence for nature".

Text of final movement
Die Felsensäulen fangen an tief und leise zu ertönen:

Hebt zu der ewigen Kraft eure Herzen;
Fühlet euch Allah nah', schaut seine Tat!
Wechseln im Erdenlicht Freuden und Schmerzen;
Ruhig hier stehen die Pfeiler der Welt.
Tausend und Tausend und abermals tausende
Jahre so ruhig wie jetzt in der Kraft,
Blitzen gediegen mit Glanz und mit Festigkeit,
Die Unverwüstlichkeit stellen sie dar.

Herzen erglüheten, Herzen erkalteten,
Spielend umwechselten Leben und Tod.
Aber in ruhigen Harren sie dehnten sich
Herrlich, kräftiglich, früh so wie spät.
Hebt zu der ewigen Kraft eure Herzen
Fühlet euch Allah nah', schaut seine Tat!
Vollends belebet ist jetzo die tote Welt.
Preisend die Göttlichkeit, schweigt das Gedicht!
Deep and quiet, the pillars of rock begin to sound:

Lift up your hearts to the power eternal,
Feel Allah's presence, behold all his works!
Joy and pain interweave in the light of the world;
The world's [mighty] pillars stand peacefully here.
Thousands and thousands and once again thousands
Of years – serene in their power as now –
Flash by purely with glory and strength,
They display the indestructible.

Hearts glowed [so brightly], hearts became colder.
Playfully interchanged life and death.
But in a peaceful awaiting they stretch out,
Gorgeous, powerfully, early and late.
Lift up your hearts to the power eternal,
Feel Allah's presence, behold all his works!
Thus the dead world comes completely to life.
Praising divinity, the poem falls quiet!

Busoni did not set the subsequent closing speech of Oehlenschläger's fortunate hero as he looks around the magic cave for the last time: but Dent's assertion that "The actual meaning of the words hardly matters" can be balanced against Aladdin's final lines:

Hier ging ich als ein Knabe, da mir noch
Selbst von den Innern nur die Außenseite
Ins Auge fiel. Ein guter Geist beglückte
Mein Leben, schenkte mir ein starkes Mittel,
Um mich durch diese Endlichkeit zu kämpfen
Zum ew'gen Gipfel. Ha, da steh' ich nun!
Wohlan, so will ich auf die Ewigkeit
Auch ferner einzig und allein vertrauen.
I came here as a boy, when as yet
Only the exterior of my inward being
Caught my eye. A good spirit charmed
My life, bestowed upon me a powerful means
By which to struggle through this finitude
Towards the eternal peak. Ha, there I stand now!
Well then, in Eternity I will furthermore
Exclusively and solely place my trust.

Other works with men's chorus
Although concerted works with voices are relatively rare, there are a number of choral and symphonic works for male voice choir. These include Luigi Cherubini's D-minor Requiem for men's chorus (1836); Le Desert, 'ode-symphonie' for orchestra, tenor solo and male chorus by Félicien David (1844); Liszt added a male chorus (setting words from Faust, Part Two) to the revised finale of his Faust Symphony of 1857–1860. Brahms' Alto Rhapsody in c minor for contralto solo, male chorus and orchestra, was written in 1869. And in 1962, Dmitri Shostakovich composed his 13th symphony in b-flat minor for bass solo, male chorus and orchestra.

There are two works including a male chorus with a more direct connection with Busoni's Piano Concerto: Aino by Robert Kajanus and Kullervo by Jean Sibelius, in which all three composers seem to evoke a similar, distinct and unusual sound-world at the first entry for the men's voices. Kajanus, the director of the Helsinki Conservatory and conductor of the fledgling Helsinki Philharmonic Orchestra, composed Aino, a symphonic poem for male chorus and orchestra in 1885. Kajanus also taught Jean Sibelius at the Conservatory, where Busoni, aged 22, was also on the teaching staff in 1888; during that year he wrote the Concert-Fantasie for piano and orchestra (BV230, Op. 29). According to Erik Tawaststjerna, "The time Sibelius spent with Busoni and the interchange of ideas contributed in no small measure to his development and in all probability to his artistic breakthrough in spring 1889.". Sibelius's Kullervo for orchestra, men's chorus, and baritone and mezzo-soprano soloists was first performed in Helsinki in 1892.

Henri Herz's Piano Concerto no. 6 in A major Op. 192 (1858) has a part-choral final movement
('Rondo oriental avec choeur') which features a hymn (in French) to 'the sons of the prophet' and 'O Mahomet divin': curiously, it ends with the words 'Gloire au prophète Allah', exactly the same sentiment expressed in the finale of the Busoni concerto.

Manuscript and publication details 
Manuscripts
Busoni Archive No. 231 (sketch)
Title: Concerto per un Pianoforte obligato principale e diversi strumenti, ad arco a fiato ed a percussione; aggiuntovi un Coro finale per voci d'uomini a 4 parti. Le parole alemanne del poeta Oehlenschlaeger, danese. la Musica di Ferruccio Busoni, da Empoli.
[Concerto for obbligato principal piano and diverse bowed, wind, and percussion instruments; additional final chorus for men's voices in 4 parts. The German words by the poet Oehlenschläger, Dane. Music by Ferruccio Busoni, from Empoli.]
Description: 48 loose sheets, partly written on one side, and partly on two; partly folio, partly not.
Note: Also contains material relating to the ending without chorus (BV 247a).
 Busoni Archive No. 232 (sketch)
Title 1: Busoni Concerto
Title 2: Concerto per un Pianoforte principale e diversi Strumenti, ad arco, a fiato ed a percussione; aggiuntovi un Coro finale per voci d'uomini a quattro parti. Le parole alemanne del poeta Oehlenschlaeger, danese; la Musica di Ferruccio Busoni, da Empoli. (Secondo abbozzo, in esteso.)
[Concerto for principal piano and diverse bowed, wind, and percussion instruments; additional final Chorus for men's voices in four parts. The German words by the poet Oehlenschläger, Dane; Music by Ferruccio Busoni, from Empoli. (Second full sketch.)]
Date: 18. Agosto 1903. (at the end of the composition)
Description: 2 title sheets; 81 leaves, written on both sides, numbered by Busoni from 1 to 41, on every second leaf (recto), corresponding to the number of quires.
Note: The sketches comprise partly piano extracts, partly short score (particell).
 Busoni Archive No. 233 (score)
Title: Conzert für Klavier u. Orch. Op. 39
On the edge: Partyt. Ms. Autogr. Busoni-Nachlaß Nr 233
Note: Lost in 1945. Now at the Jagiellonian University in Cracow.

Publications
 Score (Partitur)
Title: Concerto per un Pianoforte principale e diversi strumenti ad arco a fiato ed a percussione. Aggiuntovi un Coro finale per voci d'uomini a sei parti. Le parole alemanne del poeta Oehlenschlaeger danese. La Musica di Ferruccio Busoni da Empoli Anno MCMIV. opera XXXIX
[Concerto for principal piano and diverse bowed, wind, and percussion instruments. Additional final Chorus for men's voices in six parts. The German words by the Danish poet Oehlenschläger. Music by Ferruccio Busoni from Empoli in the year 1904. opus XXXIX.]
Date: Finis. il 3.d'Agosto 1904. (at the end of the composition)
Instrumentation: Un pianoforte principale, 2 Flauti piccoli, 3 Flauti, 3 Oboi, 1 Corno inglese, 3 Clarinetti, 1 Clarinetto basso, 3 Fagotti, 4 Corni, 3 Trombe, 3 Tromboni, 1 Tuba, 3 Timpani, Tamburo militare, Gran Cassa, Tamburino, Triangolo, Piatti, un giuoco di Campanelli a tastiera (Glockenspiel), un Gong Chinese (Tamtam), 12 Violini primi, 10 Violini secondo, 8 Viole, 8 Violoncelli, 6 Contrabassi a 4 Corde, 2 Contrabassi che discendono al Do di 16 piedi, un Coro di voci d'uomini composto di 48 cantori.
Published: Breitkopf & Härtel, 1906, cat. no. Part B. 1949; (328 pages); cat. no. Ch. B. 1844; (men's chorus)
 Arrangement for 2 pianos; revised extended cadenza
Published: Breitkopf & Härtel, 1909. EB 2861, ed. Egon Petri; score (178 pages); extended cadenza rev. by Busoni, 1909 (5 pages).

Performances
Recordings

 Other concert performances
In addition to the above list of recordings, the concerto has also received concert performances in recent years by (among others, in alphabetical order): Marc-André Hamelin, Giovanni Bellucci; Karin Dayas, Christopher Falzone; Carlo Grante; Randall Hodgkinson; Martin Jones; Piers Lane; Janos Solyom ;

Videos
YouTube links (in alphabetical order):
 Volker Banfield;
 Christopher Falzone (with OSO and transcription for solo piano_complete);
 Marc-André Hamelin; (originally telecast on March 31, 2001 on the Finnish commercial television station MTV3; 4th movement only appears on It's All About the Music Hyperion DVDA68000);
 Noel Mewton-Wood;
 John Ogdon;
 Garrick Ohlsson;
 Kun Woo Paik;
 Egon Petri (4th movement);
 Pietro Scarpini.

Noncommercial recordings
A performance of the concerto by Pietro Scarpini with George Szell and the Cleveland Orchestra and Chorus was broadcast on New York's WQXR on July 10, 1966. They had previously performed the concerto in Carnegie Hall, New York, on February 7, 1966.

The amateur pianist, industrialist, and philanthropist Sir Ernest Hall (a contemporary of John Ogdon at the Royal Manchester College of Music) performed the concerto in 2000 with the Sheffield Symphony Orchestra and the Halifax Choral Society conducted by John Longstaff. A recording is available through the SSO website.

References
Notes

Citations

Sources

 
 
 
 
 
 
 
 
 
 
 
 
 
 
  See also Facsimile pages
 
  See also Zweiter Teil

External links 

Roberge, Marc-André (1981). "Le Concerto pour piano, orchestre et chœur d'hommes, op. 39 (1904), de Ferruccio Busoni: étude historique et analytique" (M.A. thesis, McGill University, 1981), ix, 254 pp.; Microcard copy available at the National Library of Canada . Accessed 3 November 2009.

Busoni Piano Concerto discography
 Busoni at Carnegie Hall. The occasion of this interview was the first New York performance of the Busoni Piano Concerto. Daniell Revenaugh, Busoni scholar and performer, is interviewed by John Whiting, with excerpts from interviews with Philipp Jarnach and Benvenuto Busoni. 8 December 1965. A KPFA program.

Compositions by Ferruccio Busoni
Busoni
Compositions for piano, chorus and orchestra
1904 compositions
Adaptations of works by Adam Oehlenschläger